Chanomphalus is a genus of gastropods belonging to the family Helicodiscidae.

The species of this genus are found in Central America.

Species:

Chanomphalus angelae 
Chanomphalus cidariscus 
Chanomphalus pilsbryi 
Chanomphalus tatei

References

Helicodiscidae